Daniel Bashiel Warner (April 19, 1815 – December 1, 1880) served as the third president of Liberia from 1864 to 1868. Prior to this, he served as the third Secretary of State in the cabinet of Joseph Jenkins Roberts from 1854 to 1856 and the fifth vice president of Liberia under President Stephen Allen Benson from 1860 to 1864.

Background

Warner, an African American, was born free on Hookstown Road in Baltimore County, Maryland, United States, to a father who was a farmer and ex-slave who acquired his freedom one year before Warner was born.

Warner's date of birth is unclear. Some records show that he was born on April 19, 1815. American Colonization Society documents list him as age nine when he emigrated to Liberia with eight relatives on the ship Oswego in 1823.

A member of the Americo-Liberian elite, before his presidency, he served as a member of the Liberian House of Representatives, including a term as Speaker of the House of Representatives from 1848 to 1849, and in the Liberian Senate. Following his presidency, in 1877, he became an agent of the American Colonization Society.

He also wrote the lyrics to the Liberian national anthem, which the country officially adopted upon its independence from the American Colonization Society in 1847.

Presidency (1864–1868)

Warner's main concern as president was his government's relationship with the area's indigenous people, particularly those in the interior of the country. He organized the first settler expedition into the interior in 1868. Led by Benjamin J. K. Anderson, the expedition resulted in the signing of a treaty between the Americo-Liberian government and the community of Moussadou in today's Guinea. Anderson took careful notes describing the people, the customs, and the natural resources of the areas he passed through, eventually publishing a report on his journey. Using the information from the report, Warner's government moved to assert limited control over the inland region.    
Warner retired after his second two-year term ended in 1868.

References

External links
History of Liberia, external links

1815 births
1880 deaths
Americo-Liberian people
National anthem writers
Presidents of Liberia
Members of the Senate of Liberia
Speakers of the House of Representatives of Liberia
Republican Party (Liberia) politicians
Politicians from Monrovia
People from Baltimore County, Maryland
19th-century Liberian politicians
19th-century African-American people